Charles Douglas Moffatt (5 July 1870 – 1 March 1953) was an English footballer, considered one of the pioneers of the sport in Argentina, active in the country as a player between 1891 and 1901.

Career

Born in London, Moffatt arrived in Argentina in November 1889 at the age of 19. He worked in some British-owned companies in the country, such as Walter Sons & Co, Hume Brothers, the Buenos Aires Western Railway and last, the Buenos Aires Great Southern Railway from which he retired in 1928.

One of his workmates in the Southern Railway was Alex Lamont of St. Andrew's Scots School, which would later establish the Argentine Association Football League (the first football body in Argentina and predecessor of current Argentine Football Association) that organized the first Primera División championship in 1891.

Moffatt participated in that tournament playing for St. Andrew's as an inside forward. At the end of the season, St. Andrew's and Old Caledonians shared the first position therefore a final match was played to award the medals. St. Andrew's won the match by 3–1 with Moffatt scoring a hat trick.

Despite of being the champion, St. Andrew's Athletic Club was dissolved that same year. After his tenure on St. Andrew's, Moffatt played for Lomas Athletic Club in 1892 and then moved to Flores Athletic Club. The last team where Moffatt played was Banfield (founded in 1896), where he played the 1897 and 1898 seasons with the team. When the second division (current Primera B Metropolitana) was created in 1899, Banfield registered a team there that would win the championship, with Moffatt as one of its players. The other teams that took part in the first tournament were English High School, Belgrano AC, Lomas, Lanús Athletic Club, Porteño, Maldonado Football Club, Scots School Club and Lomas' Barker Memorial School.

Moffat retired from football in 1901, although he continued practising sports, such as rowing, swimming, tennis and cricket. He is recognized as founder of the Gascón Lawn Tennis Club in Banfield, Buenos Aires and the Rowing Club in La Plata.

Titles
St. Andrew's
 Primera División (1): 1891

Banfield 
 Segunda División (1): 1899

References

English footballers
Association football forwards
Argentine Primera División players
1870 births
1953 deaths
Club Atlético Banfield footballers
English emigrants to Argentina
Flores Athletic Club players